Legnotus is a genus of true bugs belonging to the family Cydnidae.

European species include:
 Legnotus fumigatus (A. Costa, 1853)
 Legnotus limbosus (Geoffroy, 1785)
 Legnotus picipes (Fallen, 1807)

References

Cydnidae